The Northern Division or Kottayam Division was one of the three (or four) administrative subdivisions of the princely state of Travancore in British India. It was established in 1856 and covered parts of Kottayam, Ernakulam  and Idukki in the present-day Kerala. The division was administered by a Diwan Peishkar, a civil servant of rank equivalent to a District Collector. The division was sub-divided into the taluks of Alangadu, Kunnatunadu, Meenachil, Muvattupuzha , Kothamangalam , Paravur, Thodupuzha and Vaikom. The headquarters of the division was first located at Cherthala, and later got shifted to Kottayam.

See also 
 Quilon Division
 Southern Division (Travancore)
 Trivandrum Division

References 

Divisions of Travancore
Regions of Kerala